Has is a municipality in Kukës County, northeastern Albania. The municipality consists of the administrative units of Fajzë, Gjinaj, Golaj with Krumë constituting its seat. As of the Institute of Statistics estimate from the 2011 census, there were 4,117 people residing in Has Municipality. The area of the municipality is 399.62 km2. It is encompassed within the Albanian ethnographic region of Has.

References

External links 
bashkiahas.gov.al – Official Website 

 
Gegëri
Municipalities in Kukës County